The 1987 Georgia Bulldogs football team represented the University of Georgia during the 1987 NCAA Division I-A football season.

Schedule

Personnel

Season summary

vs Florida

References

Georgia
Georgia Bulldogs football seasons
Liberty Bowl champion seasons
Georgia Bulldogs football